The Western Herald may refer to:

Western Herald, the student newspaper of Western Michigan University in Kalamazoo, Michigan
Western Herald (Bourke), a print newspaper published in Bourke, New South Wales, Australia